Eastleigh is a town in Hampshire, England.

Eastleigh may also refer to:
 Eastleigh, the town in Hampshire, England.  
 Borough of Eastleigh, local government area around the town
 Eastleigh F.C.
 Eastleigh (UK Parliament constituency)
 Eastleigh, Devon, a location in England
 Eastleigh, Nairobi, Kenya, eastern suburb of the city
RAF Eastleigh, former airbase in the suburb